Davanzati is a surname. Notable people with the surname include:

Bernardo Davanzati (1529 – 1606), Italian economist and translator
Chiaro Davanzati (died 1304), Italian poet
Roberto Forges Davanzati (1880–1936), Italian journalist, academic and politician

See also
Palazzo Davanzati